The chronology of Ukrainian language suppression presents a list of administrative actions aimed at limiting the influence and importance of the Ukrainian language in Ukraine.

Language situation in Ukrainian lands before the 19th century 
Before the Russian annexation, there were several writing languages in Ukraine. Religious texts were dominated by the Ukrainian variant of Church Slavonic (the so-called Meletian, after the reforms Meletius Smotrytsky). The language of administration since the 16th and 17th centuries (for western Ukraine this process began as early as the 15th century) was Polish, as well as Latin. The significant degree of Polonization of the Ukrainian elites led to the fact that Polish was also used in other areas, and in the 17th century it became the main language of religious polemics. Ukrainians who did not undergo language polonization used Church Slavonic in high-ranking texts (liturgical, theological, dramatic texts, poetry), and Ruthenian in lower-ranking texts (tales, private documents), also known as prosta mova. The latter initially developed in the Belarusian territories and had many features of the spoken Belarusian language, but over time it took over the features of the local language in the Ukrainian territories, and also borrowed much from Church Slavonic and Polish. The language shaped in this way became the language of administration in the Cossack Hetmanate, it also began to be used as the language of literature, became standardized and moved away from the spoken language.

At the end of the 18th century Ivan Kotliarevsky (1769-1838) initiated the process of formation of the modern literary Ukrainian language, based on south-eastern dialects and prosta mova. Due to restrictions imposed by the Russian government, the development of the Ukrainian language moved to western Ukraine, which led to changes in the language, called "Galicianisms." 

The systematic suppression of the Ukrainian language by the Russian Empire began with the conquest of a large part of Ukraine by Russia (Left-bank Ukraine) in 1654-1667, and also after the liquidation of the Cossack Hetmanate and the Zaporozhian Sich in 1764 and 1775. The unsuccessful rebellion of Cossack Hetman Ivan Mazepa (1708-1709), who attempted to throw off Russian supremacy, can be taken as the starting moment. Unlike Ukraine under Russian rule, there were no administrative obstacles to the development of the Ukrainian literary language in Western Ukraine, which was part of the Austrian Empire. However, due to its inferior status (the official language was first German, then Polish, the Ukrainian community lacked a Ukrainian-speaking intelligentsia) its development was hampered.

17-18th century
 1693 – Patriarch Adrian of Moscow allows only brief works to be printed in the "local dialect," bans their distribution outside the Ukrainian eparchies. He was following the teaching of Patriarch Joachim, who introduced an obligatory doctrine, repressing any peculiarities, including Ukrainian recension of Church Slavonic and about 300 books published in Kyiv throughout the 17th century.
 1720 – Peter I prohibits the printing houses of the Pechersk Lavra and Chernihiv from printing any books, except religious books, and those only using the "Great Russian language", by which one should essentially understand the Russian version of Church Slavonic. In practice, this means a ban on using the Ukrainian redaction of Church Slavonic in print.
 1766 – the Most Holy Synod, governing body of the Russian Orthodox Church, orders the printing houses of the Pechersk Lavra and Chernihiv to stop sending requests for publication of new books, and instead print only those previously printed in Moscow, without changing their content nor language.
In 1765-1786, the administrative language of the Hetmanate was gradually Russified, it let to the complete adoption of Russian as the language of administration of Ukrainian lands in place of the Ruthenian language (prosta mova) ad the end of the period. As a result Ruthenian language is limited to the private use and to works not designed for printing.

19th century
 1863 – Circular issued by Russia's minister of internal affair Pyotr Valuyev prohibiting censors from giving permission to the publication of Ukrainian spiritual and popular educational literature.
 1861 – a July 26 resolution by the Austrian State Ministry allows reading instruction in the native language
 1864 – Adoption of the Charter of the primary school at which education was to be conducted only in Russian.
 1866 – the December 31 Diet of Galicia and Lodomeria resolution gives the right to decide on the language of instruction in elementary schools to the people and institutions that maintain the school. In the case of public schools, this decision was made by the local authority, when the composition of the school was mixed the school had to be bilingual (the resolution was introduced on June 22, 1867)
 1867 – Austrian December Constitution guarantees all residents of Cisleithania the right to education in their native language
 1869 – Polish language replaces German as the official language of education and of the administration in Austrian Kingdom of Galicia and Lodomeria.
 1876 - Alexander II's Ems decree banning the printing and importing from abroad of any text in Ukrainian, with exceptions of belles lettres and historical records, it also banned stage performances, public recitations and schooling in Ukraine, as well as it ordered removal of all Ukrainian book from school libraries, teachers that were suspected of Ukrainophilism were to be transferred outside of Ukraine
 1881 – the modification of the Ems Decree allowed use of Ukrainian with the Russian alphabet in dictionares, as well as the stage perfromances under permission of local governors

20th century
 1903 – Kiev governor-general Mikhail Dragomirov permits printing of fiction in Ukrainian, with the use of Russian alphabet in the Kievskaia starina magazine
 1905 – formal removal of the bans on Ukrainian publications in Russia
 1911 – Resolution VIIth congress of the nobility in Moscow's only Russian-language education and the inadmissibility of the use of other languages in schools in Russia.
 1913 – Ukrainian banned from all public schools in Alberta, Canada, home to the largest Ukrainian diaspora community in the New World at that time.
 1914 – Prohibition of celebrating the 100th anniversary of Taras Shevchenko, the decree of Nicholas II prohibition of the Ukrainian press.
 1914, 1916 – Russification campaign in western Ukraine, the prohibition of the Ukrainian word, education, church.
 1922 – Part of the proclamation of the Central Committee of the RCP (b), and the Communist Party (b) the "theory" of the struggle between the two cultures in Ukraine – city (Russian) and peasant (Ukrainian), which should win the first one.
 1924 – Law of the Republic of Poland on limiting the use of the Ukrainian language in the administration, judiciary, education subservient to the Polish lands.
 1924 – Kingdom of Romania law on the obligations of all the "Romanians" who "lost their mother language," to educate children only in Romanian schools.
 1925 – Ukrainian final closure of the "secret" of the university in Lviv
 1926 – Stalin's letter to "Comrade. Kaganovich and other members of the Politburo of the Central Committee of the CP (B) U with the sanction of the struggle against the "national bias", the beginning harassment of "Ukrainization".
 1933 – Stalin's telegram to stop "Ukrainization".
 1933 – Abolition in Romania Ministerial Decree of 31 December 1929, which permits a few hours a week of the Ukrainian language in schools with a majority of students with the Ukrainians.
 1934 – A special order of the Ministry of Education of Romania's dismissal "for the hostile attitude of the State and the Romanian people" of all Ukrainian teachers who demanded the return to school of Ukrainian.
 1958 – Enshrined in Art. 20 Principles of Legislation of the USSR and the Union Republics on Public Education of the situation on the free choice of language learning, the study of all languages except Russian, at the request of students' parents.
 1960–1980 – Mass closure of Ukrainian schools in Poland and Romania.
 1970 – Order of the Ministry of Education of the USSR on academic thesis defense only in Russian language.
 1972 – Prohibition of party bodies to celebrate the anniversary of the museum Kotlyarevskyi in Poltava.
 1973 – Prohibition to celebrate the anniversary of Ivan Kotlyarevsky's "Aeneid."
 1984 – Order of the Ministry of Culture of the USSR on the transfer proceedings in all the museums of the Soviet Union, the Russian language.
 1984 – Back to the USSR payments increased by 15% of the salary for teachers of the Russian language in comparison with teachers of Ukrainian language.
 1989 – the decree of the Central Committee of the CPSU on "legislative consolidation of the Russian language as a nationwide".
 1990 – adoption by the Supreme Soviet of the USSR Law on the languages of the peoples of the USSR, where the Russian language was granted official status.

21st century
 2012 – The Verkhovna Rada of Ukraine draft law "On State Language Policy", which steadily narrowed the scope of use of the Ukrainian language in most of the regions of Ukraine.
 2014 – The Ukrainian language has been suppressed in Russia-occupied Crimea,  so-called Luhansk People's Republic, and so-called Donetsk People's Republic (see Occupied territories of Ukraine).
 2022 – After the Russian invasion of Ukraine, high-level Russian officials repeatedly denying the existence of Ukrainian language (and Ukrainian culture and national identity) is cited as part of incitement to genocide in a report by more than thirty experts. Also russians reportedly burn ukrainian books en masse on occupied territories and brought their teachers to the occupied territories to teach propaganda history.

See also 
 Ethnocide
 Language death
 Linguistic discrimination
 Holodomor

References

Sources 

 Очеретянко С. І., Рябець Л. В. Заборона української мови // Енциклопедія сучасної України : у 30 т / ред. кол. І. М. Дзюба [та ін.] ; НАН України, НТШ, Координаційне бюро енциклопедії сучасної України НАН України. — К., 2003–2019. — .
 Сушко Роман, Левицький Мирослав // «Хроніка нищення Української мови» (від доби Романових до сьогодення), видання четверте виправлене й доповнене, вид. Б. МММ «Таля», м. Київ, 2012 р., 80 с. – 
 Енциклопедія українознавства : Словникова частина : [в 11 т.] / Наукове товариство імені Шевченка ; гол. ред. проф., д-р Володимир Кубійович. — Париж ; Нью-Йорк : Молоде життя ; Львів ; Київ : Глобус, 1955—2003.
 , «Хронологія мовних подій в Україні: зовнішня історія української мови». — Kyiv: К. І. С., 2004. — 176 с.
 : documents and materials. Упорядники: Masenko Larysa, Victor Kubaichuk, Demska Orysia. — Київ: Видавничий дім «Києво-Могилянська академія», 2005. — 399 с. 
 
 Куземська, Ганна. Нездоланна Україна: Хроніка нищення української Церкви, мови, культури, народу / Рецензенти: Г. П. Півторак, Л. Т. Масенко, І. К. Патриляк. — К. : Фенікс, 2014. — 132 с. — .
 Andrii Danylenko, The “Doubling of Hallelujah” for the “Bastard Tongue”: The Ukrainian Language Question in Russian Ukraine, 1905–1916 // Harvard Ukrainian Research Institute
 
 
 

 
 

 

Ukrainian language
Ukraine history-related lists
Anti-Ukrainian sentiment
Ukrainian
Language policy in Ukraine
Language policy in Russia